Kids on Keys is a 1983 educational video game by Spinnaker Software, designed by Freeda Lekkerkerker.

Production 
Spinnaker president David Seuss explained that the intention of the program was not to teach typing; rather it was to promote "keyboard familiarity", teaching kids how to reach all the keys and to type faster. Lekkerkerker wanted the game to challenge players who wanted to advance beyond using a joystick while gaming.

Gameplay 
The game contains three minigames to teach young players basic language and typing skills. In the first, players have to type the correct falling letter before it hits the ground. The second sees the player type the full name of household items before the words reach the bottom of the screen. The third sees names of objects appear at the bottom of the screen, while a series of pictorial icons appear in the center, with the players tasked to press the number on their keyboard that corresponds to that object's icon.

Commercial performance 
Kids on Keys entered the Billboard charts for Top Educational Computer Software at #8 on February 9, 1985. By this time the game had sold over 150,000 copies, and had been successful during the 1983 and 1984 holiday seasons.

Critical reception 
Texas Monthly thought the game was "imaginative", and a decent rote-learning game, adding that along with Early Games it offered a great first computing experience for young gamers.

References

External links 
Kids on Keys at Atari Mania

1983 video games
Atari 8-bit family games
Commodore 64 games
VIC-20 games
TRS-80 Color Computer games
DOS games
ZX Spectrum games
Video games developed in the United States
Typing video games
Spinnaker Software games